Renmin Subdistrict  is a subdistrict situated in Linwei District, Weinan, Shaanxi, China. , it administers Shuguang Village and the following eleven residential neighborhoods:
Yuanlipu Community
Nantang Community
Shengli Community
Xiaoqiao Community
Dongfeng Community
Beitang Community
Xinmin Community
Minsheng Community
Youxi Community
Xiaozhai Community
Xuanhua Community

See also
List of township-level divisions of Shaanxi

References

Township-level divisions of Shaanxi
Weinan
Subdistricts of the People's Republic of China